Jakub Fúzik (born January 17, 1992) is a Czech professional ice hockey player who currently plays with HC Kometa Brno in the Czech Extraliga.

References

External links

Czech ice hockey forwards
HC Kometa Brno players
Living people
1992 births
People from Havířov
Sportspeople from the Moravian-Silesian Region